Dominique-France Loeb-Picard (born 23 November 1948), also called Princess Fadila of Egypt, is the French ex-wife of Fuad II, former King of Egypt and the Sudan.

Life and family
Dominique-France Loeb-Picard was born on 23 November 1948 into a Jewish family in Paris as the daughter of Jewish-Alsatian archaeologist Prof. David-Robert Loeb and his French-Swiss wife, Paule-Madeleine Picard. Aged 29, as a student at the Sorbonne, Fadila wrote her doctoral thesis on the psychology of women in The Book of One Thousand and One Nights.

Marriage and divorce
Loeb-Picard met and began a courtship with deposed king Fuad II; they contracted a civil marriage on 16 April 1976 in Paris, followed by a religious wedding in Monaco on 5 October 1977. Although she married Fuad II long after the loss of his throne, she was still styled as Her Majesty Queen Fadila of Egypt by monarchists.

Fadila choose a Turkish yashmak as her bridal headcraft, symbolising her conversion to her husband's religion.

The marriage ended in divorce in 1996, and afterwards she was styled as Her Royal Highness Princess Fadila of Egypt. In 2002, her apartment in Paris was taken from her due to her outstanding debts  The marriage was dissolved in 2008, and her royal style and title were removed by Fuad II.

Children

She and Fuad II have three children:
Muhammad Ali, Prince of the Sa'id (born 5 February 1979)
Princess Fawzia-Latifa of Egypt (born 12 February 1982)
Prince Fakhruddin of Egypt (born 25 August 1987)

References

Bibliography

Muhammad Ali dynasty
1948 births
Living people
People from Paris
20th-century French Jews
French Muslims
French people of Jewish descent
Converts to Islam from Judaism
Princesses by marriage